Arge is a genus of sawflies belonging to the family Argidae subfamily Arginae.

Species
These 57 species belong to the genus Arge:

 Arge abdominalis b
 Arge auripennis Konow, 1891 g
 Arge beckeri (Tournier, 1889) g
 Arge berberidis Schrank, 1802 g – berberis sawfly
 Arge captiva Schrank, 1802 g
 Arge caucasica Tournier, 1889 g
 Arge cerulea b
 Arge ciliaris (Linnaeus, 1767) g
 Arge clavicornis (Fabricius, 1781) g
 Arge coccinea b
 Arge curvaria Smith, 1989 b
 Arge cyanocrocea (Förster, 1771) g
 Arge cyra (Kirby, 1882) b
 Arge dimidiata (Fallén, 1808) g
 Arge enodis (Linnaeus, 1767)
 Arge expansa (Klug, 1834) g
 Arge flavicollis (Cameron, 1876) g
 Arge frivaldszkyi (Tischbein, 1852) g
 Arge fuscipennis (Herrich-Schäffer, 1833) g
 Arge fuscipes (Fallén, 1808) g
 Arge goellnerae Koch & Goergen, 2008 g
 Arge gracilicornis (Klug, 1814) g
 Arge humeralis (Beauvois) i c g b – poison ivy sawfly
 Arge illuminata Smith, 1989 b
 Arge macleayi b
 Arge massajae Gribodo, 1879 g
 Arge melanochroa (Gmelin, 1790) g
 Arge metallica (Klug, 1834) g
 Arge nigripes (Retzius, 1783) g
 Arge nokoensis Takeuchi, 1928 g
 Arge ochropus (Gmelin, 1790) g b – rose sawfly
 Arge onerosa b
 Arge pagana (Panzer, 1798) g
 Arge pallidinervis Gussakovskij, 1935 g
 Arge pectoralis (Leach) i c g b – birch sawfly
 Arge pleuritica (Klug, 1834) g
 Arge pullata (Zaddach, 1859) g
 Arge pyracanthae Wei & Shinohara g
 Arge quidia Smith, 1989 b – willow oak sawfly
 Arge rustica (Linnaeus, 1758)
 Arge sauteri (Enslin, 1911) g
 Arge scapularis b – elm argid sawfly
 Arge scita (Mocsáry, 1880) g
 Arge shawi Liston, 1992 g
 Arge similis (Vollenhoven, 1860) g – azalea argid sawfly
 Arge simulatrix Konow, 1887 g
 Arge sorbi Schedl & Pschorn-Walcher, 1984 g
 Arge spiculata (MacGillivray) b
 Arge stecki Benson, 1939 g
 Arge tergestina (Kriechbaumer, 1876) g
 Arge thoracica (Spinola, 1808) g
 Arge tsunekii Togashi, 1973 g
 Arge ustulata (Linnaeus, 1758) g
 Arge vulnerata Mocsary, 1909 g
 Arge willi Smith, 1989 b
 Arge xanthogaster Cameron, 1876 g

Data sources: i = ITIS, c = Catalogue of Life, g = GBIF, b = Bugguide.net

References

 Biolib
 Fauna Europaea

Sawfly genera
Articles containing video clips
Argidae